The Telen River  is a river in East Kalimantan, Borneo island, Indonesia, about  north of the provincial capital Samarinda. It is a tributary of the Mahakam River.

Geography
The river flows in the eastern area of Borneo with predominantly tropical rainforest climate (designated as Af in the Köppen-Geiger climate classification). The average annual rainfall is 2932 mm. The wettest month is February, with an average of  rainfall, and the driest is September, with a  rainfall.

See also
List of rivers of Indonesia
List of rivers of Kalimantan

References

Rivers of East Kalimantan
Rivers of Indonesia